Pamianthe is a genus of South American bulbous perennials in the Amaryllis family, subfamily Amaryllidoideae. They can be found in sandy, but rocky areas in Colombia, Ecuador, Peru, and Bolivia.

The  plants produce umbels of large, fragrant white flowers in the spring. They resemble daffodils, hence the common name Peruvian daffodil for at least one of the species.

Species
, Plants of the World Online accepts three species:
Pamianthe ecollis Silverst., Meerow & Sánchez-Taborda – Colombia (Cauca)
 Pamianthe parviflora Meerow – Ecuador (Zamora-Chinchipe)
 Pamianthe peruviana Stapf (syn. Pamianthe cardenasii) (Peruvian Daffodil) – Peru, Bolivia (Cochabamba)

Formerly included
see Leptochiton 
 Pamianthe andreana - Leptochiton quitoensis
 Pamianthe quitoensis - Leptochiton quitoensis

References

Amaryllidaceae genera
Amaryllidoideae
Taxonomy articles created by Polbot